Eduard Ziaziulin (born 29 October 1998) is a Belarusian weightlifter, competing in the super-heavyweight category (+105 kg until 2018 and +109 kg starting in 2018 after the International Weightlifting Federation reorganized the categories).

Career
Ziaziulin started as a junior weightlifter competing at the 2017 Junior World Weightlifting Championships and the 2017 European Junior & U23 Weightlifting Championships, placing fourth in both competitions. In the following European Junior & U23 Championships, he got first overall, his first first place finish at a junior level. In the same year, he participated in his first world championships while still being a junior lifter, the 2018 World Weightlifting Championships. He finished in eighth place.

At his first European Championships the 2019 European Weightlifting Championships he got fourth, his best rank so far at the senior level. He competed at his second world championships, the 2019 World Weightlifting Championships. He finished fourth.  He then participated at the 2019 European Junior & U23 Weightlifting Championships now competing as an U23 lifter, he got a second place overall finish.

At the 2021 European Weightlifting Championships, he once again finished with a fourth place position. In the U23 level, he participated in the 2021 European Junior & U23 Weightlifting Championships, finishing second, once again being defeated by Varazdat Lalayan of Armenia. He then participated at the 2021 World Weightlifting Championships, finishing with a bronze medal in the snatch, his first minor medal at the senior level, finishing fourth overall.

He is currently suspended by the International Weightlifting Federation as the International Weightlifting Committee decided to suspend lifters from Russia and Belarus for their countries military action to invade Ukraine.

Major results

References

1998 births
Living people
Belarusian male weightlifters
21st-century Belarusian people